Daughtry is the debut album by American rock band Daughtry, released on November 21, 2006, by RCA Records. The band is fronted by American Idol fifth season-finalist Chris Daughtry. The release is the fastest-selling debut rock album in Soundscan history and the band's bestselling record.

Background and production
"Breakdown", as it appears on Daughtry, is actually a rewrite and combination of two songs previously recorded by Chris Daughtry's former hard rock/alternative metal band, Absent Element. The songs "Conviction" and "Break Down" appeared on the EP Uprooted.

Promotion and release
The first single released from the album is "It's Not Over", and fellow Idol contestant  Ace Young, producer Gregg Wattenberg, and Course of Nature frontman Mark Wilkerson are credited as co-writers. On December 25, 2008, the song was nominated for Best Rock Song and Best Rock Performance by a Duo or Group with Vocals at the 50th Annual Grammy Awards.
In 2007, WWE used "There and Back Again" as the theme song for their April pay-per-view Backlash. In the same year, the song "Feels Like Tonight" was used for their annual Tribute to the Troops special.

Singles
"It's Not Over" led the album release and proved to be a success, reaching the top five on multiple charts, including the U.S. Billboard Hot 100, where it peaked at number four.

The next single, "Home", joined "It's Not Over" on the Billboard Hot 100, peaking at number five and making Daughtry the first debut album by an Idol contestant to contain two top-five Hot 100 singles. Meanwhile, "What I Want" was released as the second single (the third overall) instead of "Home", and reached the top ten on Mainstream Rock, peaking at number six.

The band's fourth single, "Over You", was released to Top 40 and Hot AC radio on July 24, 2007, peaking in the top twenty of the Hot 100.  "Crashed" (the fifth overall single), was released in place of "Over You" on rock stations on September 10, 2007.

The sixth single from the album, "Feels Like Tonight", was released on January 8, 2008. The song became a top forty Hot 100 hit for the band, peaking at number 24. The seventh and final single, "What About Now", was released on July 1, 2008. However, the song reached the top twenty of the Hot 100 over two months before its release, making it the band's fourth top twenty hit off the album on the chart.

Critical reception

Critical response to Daughtry was mixed: while many critics felt that the album was generally pleasing and the first real "rock" album from American Idol alumni, others felt it was unoriginal and too commercial.  While Ken Barnes of USA Today conceded that Chris Daughtry has "strong pipes and palpable angst", overall he found the band "generic", calling them "FuelNickelStaindback". People magazine found the album "a solid if not spectacular effort that at the very least proves that Chris Daughtry is not just another Idol also-ran." Christian Hoard with Rolling Stone said that "[Chris] Daughtry gets points for not courting soccer moms, but just because he can howl like a motherfucker doesn't mean he's not a cheeseball". In a mixed review, Billboard said the album "is music tailor-made for ill-conceived radio formatting, music for consumers whose taste has already been well-established if not preprogrammed", then added, "But [Chris] Daughtry sure does sing his butt off". Stephen Thomas Erlewine of Allmusic awarded the album three-and-a-half stars out of five, calling it "a debut that's not only a lot more credible than any American Idol-affiliated rock album should be, but it's a lot easier to digest than most of its ilk".

The record won an American Music Awards in 2007 for Favorite Pop-Rock Album. It was nominated for four 2008 Grammy Awards: Best Rock Album, Best Rock Song for "It's Not Over", Best Pop Performance by a Duo or Group with Vocals for "Home", and Best Rock Performance by a Duo or Group with Vocals for "It's Not Over"; the album did not win any.

Commercial performance
Competing with a flurry of releases during its opening week (Jay-Z, The Beatles, Johnny Cash, and others), Daughtry proved to be commercially viable. The album debuted at number two on the U.S. Billboard 200, behind Jay-Z's Kingdom Come. It sold approximately 304,000 copies in its first week.

The album reached number one on the Billboard 200, with 65,000 copies sold in its ninth week on the chart, for the issue dated February 3, 2007, becoming the first album from an Idol alumnus to top the Billboard 200 since Ruben Studdard's Soulful in December 2003. The following week, the album fell to number three on the chart, but its sales increased to 80,000. The record remained at number three and sold nearly 80,000 copies in each of the subsequent three weeks. After this, sales increased to 102,000 copies, but the album dropped to number 9 on the Billboard 200; in the following week, the album climbed to number 2 on the Billboard 200 and sold 84,000 copies. In the next week, its fifteenth on the chart, it climbed back to the number-one spot. It was then certified Double Platinum on March 7, 2007. The album was released in the UK on August 20 and debuted at number thirteen.

For the chart week of June 30, 2007, the album was certified 3× Platinum. It stayed in the top 10 of the Billboard 200 for 27 of the first 28 weeks of its release.

The deluxe version of the album was released on the chart week of September 9, 2008 and brought a 95% leap to the previous week.

Daughtry is the only debut album in the history of SoundScan to have stayed in the top 200 for 575 weeks. The record had sold 5,040,000 units in the US as of December 2015 and has been certified six-times platinum by the RIAA in 2019. It spent a total of 148 weeks in the Top 40.

Track listing

  Joshua Hartzler is not credited in liner notes but is registered under BMI for co-writing "What About Now".

Personnel
Credits from album liner notes and AllMusic.

Vocals
 Chris Daughtry – lead vocals

Instruments 

 Howard Benson – keyboards
 Paul Bushnell – bass
 Chris Chaney - bass on "What About Now"
 Josh Freese – drums
 Brent Smith - guitar on "There and Back Again"
 Samuel Formicola – viola
 Endre Granat – violin
 Jonathan Karoly – cello
 Victor Lawrence – violin
 Songa Lee – violin
 Jason Lippman – cello
 Jamie Muhoberac – keyboards on "What About Now" and "Feels Like Tonight"
 Cheryl Norman – violin
 Grace Oh – viola
 Alyssa Park – violin
 Phil X – lead and rhythm guitars
 Mike Robertson – violin
 Slash – lead guitar on "What I Want"
 Josefina Vergara – violin
 Dave Walther – viola

Production

 Howard Benson – producer, programming
 Paul DeCarli – digital editing
 Simon Fuller – manager
 Pete Ganbarg – A&R
 Hatsukazu "Hatch" Inagaki – assistant engineer
 Ted Jensen – mastering
 Deborah Lurie – string arrangements
 Nik Karpen – assistant
 Chris Lord-Alge – mixing
 Sterling McIIwaine – manager
 Paul Pavao – assistant
 Mike Plotnikoff – engineer, mixer
 Casey Stone – string engineer
 Marc VanGool – guitar technician

Imagery
 Frank Hawkins – art direction
 Frank W.3 Ockenfels – photography

Chart positions

Weekly charts

Year-end charts

Decade-end charts

All-time charts

Certifications and sales

Release history

Notes

References

External links
 Soundfires.com review of "Home"

2006 debut albums
Daughtry (band) albums
Albums produced by Howard Benson
RCA Records albums
19 Recordings albums